Richard Roland Hawley (born 13 August 1955) is a British actor, best known for his work in Grushko, Prime Suspect, Family Affairs, as well as Alex, the Deputy Prime Minister in  Love Actually, and Johnny Connor in Coronation Street. He has done voice work in the video game ZombiU as The Prepper, and The Witcher 3: Wild Hunt portraying the character Sigi Reuven, known better as Sigismund Dijkstra.

Despite suggestions to the contrary, Jorvik Viking Centre (York) staff have confirmed that it is not Sean Bean who completes the commentary on their trains, but Richard Hawley.

References

External links

1955 births
Living people
British male actors
British male soap opera actors
20th-century British male actors
21st-century British male actors